Sérent is a commune in the Morbihan department of Brittany in north-western France. Inhabitants of Sérent are called in French Sérentais.

Geography

Sérent belongs to the natural region of Les Landes de Lanvaux, a forest covered area. Historically it belongs to Vannetais.

Map

See also
Communes of the Morbihan department

References

External links

Official website 

 Mayors of Morbihan Association 

Communes of Morbihan